The 2008 NCAA Division III men's lacrosse tournament was held from May 10 through May 25, 2008. This was the 29th annual Division III NCAA Men's Lacrosse Championship tournament. Sixteen NCAA Division III college men's lacrosse teams met after having played their way through a regular season, and for some, a play-in game to advance to the tournament.

The tournament culminated with the finals held on Memorial Day weekend at Gillette Stadium in Foxborough, Massachusetts. The championship weekend, which included the Division I and Division II championships, was hosted by Harvard University and the Eastern College Athletic Conference. The game set an attendance record for the Division III title game of 24,317 fans.

The championship featured a third consecutive meeting between perennial powerhouses Cortland State Red Dragone and Salisbury Sea Gulls. The Sea Gulls victory sealed their 20th straight appearance, 26th overall in the NCAA Division III tournament, and capped of an undefeated season.  They have a record of 45-18 all-time in the tournament and is a new Division III record beating Hobart's old record of 41.

Play-in games
The final four rounds of the tournament were preceded by five play-in games on May 7:
 Springfield 17 – Kean 2
 Bowdoin 11 – Mount Ida 5
 Western New England 14 – Western Connecticut State 4
 Ohio Wesleyan 12 – Kenyon 8
 Denision 19 – Widener 6

Tournament results 

 * = Overtime

References

NCAA Division III Men's Lacrosse Championship
NCAA Division III Men's Lacrosse Championship
NCAA Division III Men's Lacrosse Championship
NCAA Division III Men's Lacrosse Championship
NCAA Division III Men's Lacrosse Championship
College sports in Massachusetts
Lacrosse in Massachusetts
Sports competitions in Foxborough, Massachusetts